Dragon Island is a small privately owned island just outside Harataonga Bay, on the northeast coast of Great Barrier Island, located  to the northeast of Auckland, in New Zealand. The island provides Harataonga Bay with shelter from easterly and southeasterly winds by blocking the bay from Pacific storms. The island is in relatively calm water, sheltered by the larger Rakitu Island to the north. It was once farmed but is now unpopulated and has reverted to scrub.

Dragon Island is also a name sometimes given (quixotically) to a small island in the Mediterranean Sea, a little more than one km wide at its greatest extent, and about 4 km long, located just off the southwestern point of the island of Majorca, approximately 210 km due east of Valencia, Spain. This island comprises the Parc Natural Sa Dragonera. It is the island referred to as Dragon Island in chapter eight of the historical novel Master and Commander by Patrick O'Brian.

See also

 List of islands of New Zealand
 List of islands
 Desert island

References

Uninhabited islands of New Zealand
Great Barrier Island
Islands of the Auckland Region
Private islands of New Zealand